Oscar Mercado (born 16 November 1963) is a Puerto Rican sailor. He competed at the 1988 Summer Olympics and the 1992 Summer Olympics.

References

External links
 

1963 births
Living people
Puerto Rican male sailors (sport)
Olympic sailors of Puerto Rico
Sailors at the 1988 Summer Olympics – Tornado
Sailors at the 1992 Summer Olympics – Tornado
Place of birth missing (living people)
20th-century Puerto Rican people